At Your Command, Madame (French: À vos ordres, Madame) is a 1942 French comedy film directed by Jean Boyer and starring Jean Tissier, Suzanne Dehelly and Jacqueline Gauthier. It is based on a story by André Birabeau.

It was made by Pathé at the company's Francoeur Studios in Paris. The film's sets were designed by the art director Lucien Aguettand.

Synopsis
When their car breaks down in the country, a couple have to stay at a nearby luxury hotel. Despite being well-off, the miserly wife takes advantage of a special offer to get her husband a cheap room by pretending he is her chauffeur while taking an expensive one for herself as a "baroness". Complications ensue however when a chambermaid begins to fall for her husband, while she herself is courted by one of the guests.

Cast
 Jean Tissier as Hector Dupuis
 Suzanne Dehelly as Odette Dupuis
 Jacqueline Gauthier as Angèle 
 Jacques Louvigny as Monsieur Palureau
 Albert Duvaleix as Le portier
 Gaby Wagner as La cocotte du 27
 Pierre Labry as Le mécanicien-chef
 Jean-Louis Allibert as Le directeur de l'hôtel 
 Nane Germon as Léa
 Gaston Modot as Le garçon d'étage
 Léonce Corne as Victor 
 Agnès Raynal as Rose Palureau
 Alfred Adam as Ferdinand - le chauffeur de Palureau

References

Bibliography 
 Goble, Alan. The Complete Index to Literary Sources in Film. Walter de Gruyter, 1999.

External links 
 

1942 films
French comedy films
1942 comedy films
1940s French-language films
Films directed by Jean Boyer
Pathé films
Films shot at Francoeur Studios
1940s French films